Type C or Type-C may refer to:

Science and technology 
 Europlug, a type C power plug
 Niemann–Pick disease, type C
 Type C videotape
 USB-C
 Chromogenic color print, a photographic print sometimes called a "Type-C print" or "C-print"

Vehicles 
 Citroën Type C
 Díaz Type C
 Sopwith Admiralty Type C
 Sopwith Special torpedo seaplane Type C
 Type C escort ship
 Type C submarine
Vickers Type C